The North European Women's Volleyball Club Championship (English. Nordic Club Championships, szw. Nordiska klubbmästerskapen) is a volleyball championship for clubs from the Nordic countries. It was established in 2007 and is organised by the North European Volleyball Zonal Association (NEVZA). In addition to the Nordic countries (Norway, Sweden, Finland, Denmark, Iceland, Faroe Islands and Greenland) other neighbouring countries may be invited such as Estonia, Lithuania, Latvia and the United Kingdom.

Winners list

Winners by club

Winners by nations

References

External links 
Official website:
 NEVZA Volleyball Association

NEVZA Women
Recurring sporting events established in 2008
2008 establishments in Europe